Anicka is a feminine given name which may refer to:

 Anicka Castañeda (born 1999), Filipina footballer
 Anicka Delgado (born 2002), Ecuadorian swimmer
 Anicka van Emden (born 1986), Dutch retired judoka
 Anicka Newell (born 1993), Canadian track and field
 Anicka Yi (born 1971), South Korean conceptual artist

See also
 Anica
 Anika

Feminine given names